Monte Vioz is a  mountain in Northern Italy, on the border between Lombardy and Trentino. It is located in the Ortler Alps.

The Forni glacier (Ghiacciaio dei Forni) lies on the west side of Monte Vioz, flowing into the Valle dei Forni. On the east side of the mountain lies the glacier Vedretta Rossa, and the smaller glacier Vedretta di Vioz is on the south side of the mountain.

The most popular climbing route is from the trailhead at Pèio Fonti, a cable car to the refuge Doss dei Cembri, and a 1,350 metre climb from there.  below the summit is the Mantova del Vioz refuge. The best season to climb is from June to September.

References

External links
 Summit Post Monte Vioz Photos

Mountains of the Alps
Alpine three-thousanders
Ortler Alps
Mountains of Trentino
Mountains of Lombardy